João Tavares Almeida (born 12 December 1998) is a Portuguese footballer who plays for Feirense as a midfielder.

Football career
On 11 November 2017, Tavares made his professional debut with Feirense in a 2017–18 Taça da Liga match against Moreirense.

References

External links

1998 births
Living people
Sportspeople from Santa Maria da Feira
Portuguese footballers
Association football midfielders
Primeira Liga players
Liga Portugal 2 players
C.D. Feirense players
S.C. Braga B players
C.D. Mafra players
Portugal youth international footballers